Pavol Biroš (1 April 1953 – 12 August 2020) was a Czechoslovak football player. He played as a defender.

During his club career he played for Slavia Prague and Tatran Prešov. Biroš made a total of 212 appearances in the Czechoslovak First League, scoring once. He earned 9 caps for the Czechoslovakia national football team, and was part of the championship-winning team at the 1976 UEFA European Football Championship.

References

External links

1953 births
2020 deaths
Czechoslovak footballers
Czechoslovakia international footballers
UEFA Euro 1976 players
UEFA European Championship-winning players
SK Slavia Prague players
FC Lokomotíva Košice players
1. FC Tatran Prešov players

Association football defenders
Sportspeople from Prešov